HMS Burlington was a 50-gun fourth rate ship of the line of the Royal Navy, built by Henry Johnson's yard at Blackwall Yard, and launched in 1695.

The Burlington was broken up in August 1733.

Notes

References

Lavery, Brian (2003) The Ship of the Line - Volume 1: The development of the battlefleet 1650-1850. Conway Maritime Press. .
Winfield, Rif (2009) British Warships in the Age of Sail 1603-1714: Design, Construction, Careers and Fates. Seaforth Publishing. .

Ships of the line of the Royal Navy
1690s ships
Ships built by the Blackwall Yard